Urban seismic risk is a subset of the general term seismic risk which describes the problems specific to centers of population when they are subjected to earthquakes.  Many risks can be minimized with good earthquake construction, and seismic analysis. One of the best ways to deal with the issue is through an earthquake scenario analysis.

Toronto
Toronto, Ontario, Canada is used as an example city in this article. The general issues are common to all cities subject to earthquakes.

Cities are a mixture of old and new construction as in this picture.  Note the old  brick building mixed in with the new highrises, and the famous Toronto CN Tower.  Similar to methodologies used in nuclear reactors, a seismic walk down of the city is the best way to identify vulnerabilities and possible places for improvement.

Toronto is located on the shores of Lake Ontario, the site of much microseismicity.  Historic records indicate that energetic earthquakes occur infrequently in the region, as with many other cities in the world, though Toronto was struck by a 5.0 magnitude earthquake on June 23, 2010, and a 5.1 magnitude earthquake on May 17, 2013.

Most new construction complies with strict building codes, and buildings designed for loads that go beyond seismic.  For example, Toronto's highrises are, for the most part, firmly situated on bedrock (for settlement reasons), and are designed for hurricane wind loads.  They are not expected to have any problems structurally during an earthquake, although they may sway noticeably.

There are many places where the risk of seismic  damage to older buildings is quite high.  Old brick buildings on poor soils are highly vulnerable to earthquake damage, particularly when the mortar holding the bricks together has decayed.  This picture shows an elevated expressway on filled land.  Although there may not be total collapse, there will be sufficient damage to incapacitate the structure.  Problems increase if there is the possibility for soil or soil liquefaction.

Even in buildings which are capable of withstanding an earthquake without structural failure there may be risk to people due to interior hazards. Items such as suspended ceilings and light fixtures have almost no seismic ruggedness.  Warehouse stores where heavy merchandise is stacked are a particular hazard.

International projects
The IDNDR secretariat launched the RADIUS (risk assessment tools for diagnosis of urban areas against seismic disasters) initiative in 1996 to promote worldwide activities for the reduction of urban seismic risk, which experienced rapid growth particularly in developing countries, by helping to raise public awareness.

Urban risk and planning
One of the disaster risk reduction themes set forth by the United Nations International Strategy for Disaster Reduction project PreventionWeb, is urban risk and planning. This theme refers to the measurement and management of urban hazards and vulnerability in order to improve awareness and local capacity to effectively reduce disaster risk.

References

External links 
 Realistic seismic appraisal of New York City
 Infrastructure Risk Research Project at The University of British Columbia, Vancouver, Canada
 PreventionWeb

Earthquake and seismic risk mitigation